Richard Ward  was the Archdeacon of Cardigan from 1951 until 1962.

Ward was educated at the University College of North Wales and St. Michael's College, Llandaff; and ordained in 1911. After curacies in Holyhead, Llanaber and Aberystwyth he was a Minor Canon at Bangor Cathedral. He  held incumbencies at Llanddyfnan, Dowlais, Aberdare  and Aberystwyth

References

Alumni of Bangor University
Alumni of St Michael's College, Llandaff
Archdeacons of Cardigan